The 1976 French Grand Prix was a Formula One motor race held at the Circuit Paul Ricard in Le Castellet, near Marseille in France, on 4 July 1976. It was the eighth race of the 1976 World Championship of F1 Drivers and the 1976 International Cup for F1 Constructors. It was the 54th French Grand Prix and the fourth to be held at Paul Ricard.

The race was won by eventual 1976 world champion James Hunt driving a McLaren M23. Hunt won by twelve seconds over the Tyrrell P34 of Patrick Depailler. It was Hunt's second win for the year and his third career Grand Prix victory, although at this stage his appeal against disqualification from the Spanish Grand Prix win had yet to be upheld. Eleven seconds further back in third was John Watson driving a Penske PC4. It was the first podium finish for both Watson and Penske, although the result only came after Ronnie Peterson's March 761 stopped with three laps to go and after Watson was disqualified for a rear wing irregularity and subsequently reinstated upon appeal.

Fourth place was taken by young Brazilian driver Carlos Pace driving a Brabham BT45 ahead of Mario Andretti (Lotus 77) and the Tyrrell P34 of Jody Scheckter.

Reigning champion Niki Lauda retired his Ferrari 312T2 with an engine failure while leading. While Hunt would eventually prove to be the challenger to Lauda for the 1976 championship Lauda's points lead at this time was over the Tyrrell pair of Patrick Depailler (26 points) and Scheckter (24 points).

Classification

Qualifying 

*Drivers with a red background failed to qualify. Ertl had failed to qualify, but he had started on the back of the grid.

Race

Championship standings after the race

Drivers' Championship standings

Constructors' Championship standings

References

French Grand Prix
French Grand Prix
1976 in French motorsport